The Anglican Church of St John the Baptist in North Cheriton, Somerset, England was built in the 14th century. It is a Grade II* listed building.

History

The church was built in the 14th century. In the 19th it underwent Victorian restoration which included rebuilding much of the fabric of the building.

The parish is part of the Camelot Churches benefice within the Diocese of Bath and Wells.

Architecture

The stone building has hamstone dressings and clay tile roofs. It consists of a three-bay nave and two-bay chancel with a north aisle with attached organ chamber and vestry and a south porch. The two-stage tower is supported by corner buttresses and has survived from the 15th century. The tower has a peal of five bells.

The interior is largely from the 19th century but it does contain part of a screen from around 1500 which has been imported from the Church of St John the Baptist in Pilton. The font may be from the 12th century. The pulpit is from 1633. Some of the stained glass is by Clayton and Bell.

See also  
 List of ecclesiastical parishes in the Diocese of Bath and Wells

References

Grade II* listed buildings in South Somerset
Grade II* listed churches in Somerset
Church of England church buildings in South Somerset